Let's Cut The Crap & Hook Up Later on Tonight (LCTC) is the debut album of Marah, released in 1998.

Track listing
"Fever" – 4:28
"Another Day at Bay" – 1:37
"Eventually Rock" – 1:35
"Formula, Cola, Dollar Draft" – 4:43
"Baby Love" – 1:52
"Phantom Eyes" – 2:29
"Rain Delay" (featuring Harry Kalas) – 2:38
"Firecracker" – 4:16
"Head On" – 2:51
"For the Price of a Song" – 3:00
"Boat" – 2:37
"Limb" – 9:12
"Punk Rock Radio" (Hidden Track) – 6:24

Personnel

 David Bielanko - singing, guitar, banjo, accordion moment, dulcimer, Marlboro Lights, secretarial duties, mess-ups, etc.
 Serge Bielanko - background singing, guitar, banjo, harmonica, steel drum moment, punk rock radio, mess-ups, etc.
 Danny Metz - stand-up, sit-down bass, South Philly do-wop moment, cell-phone, beeper, mess-ups, etc.
 Ronnie Vance - drums, cymbals, sticks, sweet spot or not, shouting, mess-ups, etc.

Rerelease
In 2004, the album was rereleased on Marah's own PHIdelity label.  In addition to new cover artwork, the rerelease included 6 previously unreleased tracks:
"Night Time"
"Borderline"
"Family Meeting"
"Johnny & the Flower"
"Dance 'Till Dawn"
"Muskie Moon"

References

1998 debut albums
Marah (band) albums